"Twinkle, Twinkle, Little Star" is a popular English lullaby. The lyrics are from an early-19th-century English poem written by Jane Taylor, "The Star". The poem, which is in couplet form, was first published in 1806 in Rhymes for the Nursery, a collection of poems by Taylor and her sister Ann. It is now sung to the tune of the French melody "Ah! vous dirai-je, maman", which was first published in 1761 and later arranged by several composers, including Mozart with Twelve Variations on "Ah vous dirai-je, Maman". The English lyrics have five stanzas, although only the first is widely known. It has a Roud Folk Song Index number of 7666.

The song is in the public domain.

Lyrics 
The English lyrics were written as a poem by Jane Taylor (1783–1824) and published with the title "The Star" in Rhymes for the Nursery by Jane and her sister Ann Taylor (1782–1866) in London in 1806:

The lyrics were first published with the tune "Ah! vous dirai-je, maman" in The Singing Master: First Class Tune Book in 1838. When sung, the first two lines of the entire poem are repeated as a refrain after each stanza.

Melody 
"Twinkle, Twinkle, Little Star" is sung to the French melody "Ah! vous dirai-je, maman".

Other versions 

Additional variations exist such as

1. From the 1840 novel Poor Jack (chapter 4), by Frederick Marryat.

2. From 1896 in Song Stories for the Kindergarten by Mildred J. Hill.

A parody of "Twinkle, Twinkle, Little Star" titled "Twinkle, Twinkle, Little Bat" is recited by the Mad Hatter in chapter seven of Lewis Carroll's Alice's Adventures in Wonderland.

An adaptation of the song, named "Twinkle, Twinkle, Little Earth", was written by Charles Randolph Grean, Fred Hertz and Leonard Nimoy. It is included on Nimoy's first album Leonard Nimoy Presents Mr. Spock's Music from Outer Space (1967).

A version using synonyms from Roget's Thesaurus exists.

The opening lyrics are also used to begin the traditional murder ballad "Duncan and Brady".

Alvin and the Chipmunks performed a swinging version cut off by David Seville.

The song can also be played as a singing game.

See also
List of nursery rhymes
 Frère Jacques
 Little Star
 Twinkling

References

External links 

 Audio segment from BBC Radio 4 Woman's Hour

Articles containing video clips
English children's songs
English folk songs
Traditional children's songs
Lullabies
English nursery rhymes
1806 poems
1838 songs
Songs based on poems
Fiction about stars